Real Rescues is a British documentary broadcast on BBC One exploring the daily work of the emergency services aired since 15 October 2007. Real Rescues is at the heart of the action with the emergency services of Hampshire including the police, fire, ambulance, coastguard and lifeboat crews. A majority of the footage has been shot around Portsmouth and Fareham. Reruns are on Watch and CBS Reality.

In the later series, other counties from across the UK began to be featured. Other emergency services, such as mountain rescue and animal rescue, were also featured.

Episodes

Series 3 started broadcasting on 20 April 2009. This series was broadcast live, and starred Louise Minchin along with Nick Knowles.

Series 5 started broadcasting on 5 July 2010 with Louise Minchin and Nick Knowles.

Series 6 started on 22 November 2010.

Series 7 started on 30 May 2011, the 8th series will begin in 2012 and will be hosted this time by Chris Hollins and Louise Minchin.

Series 8 started on 11 June 2012.

Series 9 started on 11 March 2013.

Series 10 started on 30 September 2013.

External links
 
Nick Knowles Site

2007 British television series debuts
2013 British television series endings
BBC high definition shows
BBC television documentaries
English-language television shows